The Codex Porfirio Díaz or Códice de Tututepetongo is a colonial Mesoamerican pictorial manuscript, consisting of a 10-page vellum screenfold. It is sometimes included in the Borgia Group.

Bibliography
 

Mesoamerican codices
Borgia Group

Middle American pictorial manuscripts